Copelatus ilybioides is a species of predaceous diving beetle in the family Dytiscidae. It is found in Africa.

References

Further reading

 
 

ilybioides
Beetles described in 1895